The Kilkenny County Board of the Gaelic Athletic Association (Kilkenny GAA) is one of the 32 county boards of the GAA in Ireland and is responsible for Gaelic games in County Kilkenny. The county board has its head office and main grounds at Nowlan Park and is also responsible for Kilkenny county teams in all codes at all levels. The Kilkenny branch of the Gaelic Athletic Association was founded in 1887.

In hurling, Kilkenny competes annually in the All-Ireland Senior Hurling Championship, which it has won 36 times (a national record), the Leinster Senior Hurling Championship, which it has won 73 times, and the National Hurling League, which it has won 19 times(a national record).

The camogie team has won the both National Camogie League and the All-Ireland Senior Camogie Championship 15 times each.

Hurling

Clubs

Clubs contest the Kilkenny Senior Hurling Championship. That competition's most successful club is Tullaroan, with 20 titles.

But the Ballyhale Shamrocks club has a better record in both the Leinster Senior Club Hurling Championship and the All-Ireland Senior Club Hurling Championship.

County team

Kilkenny is the most successful county team at senior level in the history of the game of hurling. Kilkenny has won the All-Ireland Championship 36 times as of 2019 and has won the provincial Leinster Championship on 71 occasions as of 2019.

The 1930s proved to be one of the county's most successful decades, book-ended by two of the most famous All-Ireland finals of all-time. The 1930s saw Kilkenny battle it out with Limerick for the title of team of the decade. In 1931, Kilkenny were back as Leinster champions before squaring up to Cork in the All-Ireland final. At half-time Cork lead. However, Kilkenny fought back to secure a draw. In the replay, Cork again led at half-time. However, Kilkenny fought back to force a second draw. In the third game of the series, Kilkenny were without the services of Lory Meagher, and Cork secured the victory by seven points. 1932 saw Kilkenny back in the All-Ireland final. Clare, surprise winners in Munster, provided the opposition. Kilkenny won the game by a goal and claimed their first championship in a decade. The following year, Kilkenny were back in their third successive championship decider, this time against Limerick. Once again, the game was a close affair; however, Kilkenny won the day to seal back-to-back All-Ireland titles. In 1935, Kilkenny regained their Leinster crown before lining out in the All-Ireland final. Limerick provided the opposition once again. Kilkenny won the close game by a single point. In 1939, the team was back in the All-Ireland final. On the day that the Second World War broke out, Kilkenny took on Cork at Croke Park. Both sides were level throughout much of the game, the climax of which was played in a thunderstorm. Terry Leahy was the hero for Kilkenny as he scored the winning point in the dying seconds of the game.

Kilkenny were forced to withdraw from the championship in the early 1940s because of an outbreak of foot-and-mouth disease in the county. They regained the Leinster title in 1943, but Antrim pulled off the biggest hurling shock of all-time by defeating 'the Cats' in the All-Ireland semi-final. In 1946, Kilkenny were back in the championship decider, this time taking on Cork. The first-half saw both sides trade the lead on several occasions. However, in the second half Cork scored five goals to deny Kilkenny for the second consecutive occasion. The Cork-Kilkenny rematch took place in the 1947 All-Ireland final. Cork were aiming to win a sixth All-Ireland title in seven years, while Kilkenny were hoping to avoid being the first team in history to lose three All-Ireland finals in-a-row. Kilkenny were leading for much of the game. However, Cork scored two late goals to nearly win the match. Terry Leahy scored the winning point once again for Kilkenny to give the county its thirteenth All-Ireland title. The All-Ireland victory in 1947 ushered in a lean period in Kilkenny hurling that lasted for over a decade. The 1957 All-Ireland final saw Kilkenny take on Waterford for the first time in the history of the championship. Waterford led with fifteen minutes left in the match. However, Kilkenny fought back to win by 4–10 to 3–12. In the 1963 All-Ireland final, Waterford fought back from being 11-points down. However, Kilkenny won by two points. In 1964 Kilkenny faced the 1961 & 1962 champions Tipperary in the All Ireland final, on this occasion they were beaten by a dominant physical Tipperary team. 1967 saw Kilkenny win another Leinster title before lining out in their fourth All-Ireland final of the decade.  Tipp again provided the opposition; however, Kilkenny got goals at vital times and secured victory. It was Kilkenny's first championship victory against their rivals Tipperary in 44 years of Championship hurling.

The Kilkenny hurling teams from 1969 until 1975 featured such players as Eddie Keher, Dick O'Hara, Ollie Walsh, Noel Skehan, Frank Cummins, Fan Larkin and Pat Henderson. 1969 saw Kilkenny wrest the Leinster title back from Wexford and qualify for an All-Ireland final appearance against Cork. The game ended in 'the Cats' favour on a score line of 2–15 to 2–9. Kilkenny won five provincial titles in-a-row between 1971 and 1975. The team also made five consecutive All-Ireland final appearances during those years, a record which stood till 2011. In 1971 Kilkenny faced Tipperary in the championship decider. In the first final broadcast in colour by RTÉ, Eddie Keher scored a record 2 goals and 11 points; however, he still ended up on the losing side as Tipp won on a score line of 5–17 to 5–14. 1972 saw the only 80-minute final between Kilkenny and Cork. Cork were in control in the second half and were eight points ahead. However, Kilkenny upped the ante and won the game by seven points, in what was a significant fifteen-point turnaround. In 1973, Kilkenny squared up to Limerick in the championship decider for the first time since 1940. Injury, illness and emigration saw a depleted Kilkenny team take on the Munster champions and lose their status as All-Ireland champions. 1974 saw a Kilkenny-Limerick rematch. Limerick took an early lead. However, 'the Cats' goal power secured a 12-point win. In 1975, Kilkenny took on a Galway side that had stunned Cork in the All-Ireland semi-final. Galway led at half-time. However, the Kilkenny men fought back and secured a 12-point victory once again. By the time the team won their next Leinster title in 1978, the successful team of the early 1970s was breaking up. 1979 saw an injection of new blood into the team as Kilkenny won their seventh provincial title of the decade. The side later took on and defeated Galway. The early 1980s saw the great Kilkenny team of the 1970s break up as Offaly emerged as a new force in Leinster. 'The Cats' fought back in 1982 by capturing the National League and the Leinster title. Christy Heffernan's two goals in a forty-second spell gave Kilkenny a victory over Cork in the subsequent All-Ireland final. In 1983, Kilkenny completed what they call 'the double-double' as they captured back-to-back League, Leinster and All-Ireland honours. Cork were defeated once again in the championship decider. Kilkenny's hopes of capturing the three-in-a-row were dashed in the provincial championship of 1984. The legendary goalkeeper Ollie Walsh took over as manager at the turn of the decade.in 1987 Galway provided the opposition in the all Ireland final, who eventually emerged victorious, 1991 saw kilkenny win the leinster title and once again met their old rivals Tipperary in the all Ireland decider 20 years on from their last meeting in 1971, Tipperary went on to lift the last outing of the original Liam McCarthy cup and extend their record over kilkenny in all Ireland final meetings with a 4-point victory. In 1992, Kilkenny retained their Leinster crown before lining out in the All-Ireland championship decider against Cork. The team played into a strong wind in the first-half. However, they emerged as the victors on a scoreline of 3–10 to 1–12. A third consecutive Leinster title was collected in 1993 before ‘the Cats’ made a third consecutive All-Ireland final appearance. On that occasion Kilkenny retained the Liam MacCarthy Cup by a margin of five points.

In 2000, Brian Cody guided Kilkenny to a third consecutive Leinster title and a third successive All-Ireland final. Kilkenny trounced Offaly to take the title. In 2003 Kilkenny completed what they call ‘the double-double’ as they captured back-to-back League, Leinster and All-Ireland honours. In 2006, Kilkenny retained their National League and Leinster titles before reaching the championship decider yet again. Cork, who were attempting to capture their own three-in-a-row, provided the opposition; however, victory went to a superior Kilkenny side. In 2007, 'the Cats' won an unprecedented ninth Leinster title from ten campaigns. They later reached the All-Ireland final where they defeated Limerick to win their thirtieth championship title. In 2008 they won the Leinster title before defeating Waterford in the All-Ireland final. This team has been called the best team ever to play the sport. Later in the year Kilkenny went on to win the All-Ireland Under-21 Hurling Championship. Combined with the All-Ireland Minor Hurling Championship title, the All-Ireland Intermediate Hurling Championship title (which is broadly a competition for the second string county teams) and of course the senior title: this marks a quadruple. The achievement was unique and marks a high point in the dominance of hurling by Kilkenny teams. In 2009, Kilkenny's dominance was lessened and it was suggested that they were entering a decline. They saw off an emerging Dublin side in the Leinster final thanks to two goals from Martin Comerford. Nevertheless, they reached the final and after a titanic battle with old rivals Tipperary which included a controversial penalty being awarded towards the end of the game, Kilkenny secured a four-in-a-row with a five-point win over Tipperary who mounted a formidable challenge to their crown in an absorbing final which made up for the mis-matches of the two previous years when only token resistance was presented by Limerick and Waterford. Kilkenny became the first team since Cork in the 1940s to do the four in a row. In 2010, Kilkenny defeated Galway to claim their twelfth Leinster title. They later reached the All-Ireland final where they faced last year's opponents Tipperary. However, it was different from 2009 as Tipperary's Lar Corbett tore through Kilkenny's full-back line with a hat trick of goals to deny Kilkenny the 5 in a row and a unique piece of hurling championship history. It was also Kilkenny's third defeat in an All-Ireland final under Cody and Kilkenny's 12th final loss to Tipperary in total. In 2011, Kilkenny faced Tipperary for the third final in a row. Kilkenny regained the All Ireland title defeating Tipperary 2–17 to 1–16. In the 2012 Leinster Senior Hurling Championship Final Kilkenny was defeated by Galway. Kilkenny bounced back beating Limerick and winning over Tipperary by double scores 4–24 to 1–15. Kilkenny then met Galway in the All Ireland Final, and when Joe Canning scored the last point of the game, he forced a replay (the first since 1959). However Kilkenny showed great character during the replayed All Ireland Final and won on a scoreline of 3–22 to 3–11, their ninth success in thirteen championship seasons. In 2013, Kilkenny failed to make the All-Ireland semi-final stage for the first time since the 1996 All-Ireland Senior Hurling Championship with many signaling an end to Kilkenny's dominance. However, Kilkenny went on to claim the 2014 Walsh Cup, the 2014 National Hurling League, the 2014 Leinster Senior Hurling Championship and their 35th 2014 All-Ireland Senior Hurling Championship. Brian Cody became the first manager in GAA history to win 10 Senior All-Ireland titles while Henry Shefflin became the first player in GAA history to win 10 Senior All-Ireland titles. The year was topped of when Richie Hogan picked up the GPA Hurler of the Year award. The 2015 season saw Kilkenny claim both the Leinster and All-Ireland title once again. Kilkenny pulled off a strong second half performance in the All-Ireland Final to see off Galway. It was Kilkenny's 36th All-Ireland win and the 11th under manager Brian Cody. The achievement was even more significant following a number of high-profile retirements at the end of the previous season. Kilkenny once again made the all Ireland final in 2016 in a bid for three titles in a row only to be defeated in a high scoring encounter by neighbour's Tipperary, 2019 saw a loss to Wexford in the Leinster final however Kilkenny recovered to shock reigning champions Limerick out of the Championship and set up another final appearance,  Old rivals Tipperary once again provided the opposition. After a good start Kilkenny faded out of the game and ultimately lost another final to their arch rivals.

Camogie

Kilkenny's Camogie breakthrough came with their first Leinster title in 1972 and All-Ireland title in 1974. They have enjoyed two periods of ascendancy in the All-Ireland Senior Camogie Championship, winning 13 titles in all, three titles in four years 1974–77, another in 1981, seven in a row between 1984 and 1991 then 1994 and the latest victory coming in 2016. They won a National Camogie League four-in-a-row 1987–90 and nine titles in all by 1993, adding five more in 2008, 2014, 2016, 2017 and 2018. They dominated the under-18 minor grade in the four years after its introduction winning the championships of 2006–9.

Five Kilkenny clubs have won the All-Ireland Senior Club Championship, St Paul's (8), St Lachtain's (3), and Lisdowney (1994). There is one Kilkenny club so far to have won the All-Ireland Intermediate Club Championship, that is Piltown in (2015).

Notable camogie players include Angela Downey and her sisters Ann and Marina Downey, team of the century members Liz Neary and Bridie Martin, player of the year recipients Mary Connery, Ann Dalton, Claire Hanrahan, Breda Holmes, Helena O'Neill and Biddy O'Sullivan, All Star award winners
Elaine Aylward. Jacqui Frisby. Imelda Kennedy, Sinéad Millea, Aoife Neary and Katie Power, young players of the year Denise Gaule and Marie Dargan, and All Ireland winners Teresa O'Neill, Ursula Grace and Ann Carroll.

Under Camogie's National Development Plan 2010–2015, "Our Game, Our Passion," five new camogie clubs are to be established in the county by 2015.

Kilkenny have the following achievements in camogie.

All-Ireland Senior Camogie Championship: 15
 (click on year for team line-outs) 1974, 1976, 1977, 1981, 1985, 1986, 1987, 1988, 1989, 1990, 1991, 1994, 2016, 2020, 2022
All-Ireland Intermediate Camogie Championship: 2
 2008, 2016
All-Ireland Junior Camogie Championship: 1
 2002
All-Ireland Minor Camogie Championship: 7
 2006, 2007, 2008, 2009, 2013, 2015, 2021
All-Ireland Under-16 Camogie Championship: 7
 1988, 1989, 1991, 2005, 2006, 2007, 2008
National Camogie League: 15
  (click on date for teams) 1978, 1980, 1982, 1985, 1987, 1988, 1989, 1990, 1993,  2008, 2014, 2016, 2017, 2018, 2021
National Junior Camogie League (Division 2): 1
 2006
Camogie All-Stars: 46
 2004 (1), 2006 (1), 2008 (1), 2009 (5), 2010 (1), 2013 (4), 2014 (3), 2016 (8), 2017 (4), 2018 (5), 2019 (4), 2020 (6), 2021 (3)

Football
In the GAA's early years, Kilkenny had some success at football. Between 1888 and 1911 Kilkenny contested seven Leinster finals, winning three. They won the first-ever Leinster Senior Football Championship, which was played in 1888, with a victory over Wexford. However, the rest of the championship was abandoned due to the players’ tour of America, known as the US invasion. Further success in Leinster followed in 1900 against Louth 12 points to no score. Kilkenny went on beat Tipperary in the 1900 All-Ireland semi final, 1–7 to 0–8. The game was refixed following an objection by Tipperary, Kilkenny refused to play, so the match was awarded to Tipperary. Tipperary went on to win the All-Ireland final, beating Galway 2–20 to 0–1. The 1911 Leinster final between Kilkenny and Meath was awarded to Meath because Kilkenny were late. Kilkenny objected and won by 2–4 to 1–1 on the field of play. In 1914, the young team mascot, Peter Dunne, had to line out to complete their team. Kilkenny county footballers have not won a senior championship match since 1929, when they defeated Louth by 0–10 to 0–4. Their best championship result since was a 3–8 to 3–4 defeat against Kildare in 1961. 1982 was their last championship campaign. In the league their 1970–71 league campaign yielded four victories and they won three games in a row in early 1988 League and O'Byrne Cup games.

Kilkenny is unique among the 32 Irish county associations in not participating in the All-Ireland Senior Football Championship. They played in the Tommy Murphy Cup, a second-tier competition for weaker footballing counties, for four of the five years it was played. However, even in this competition they lost every game they played. Kilkenny entered the National Football League for the first time in many years in 2008 but did not find any success, losing every game bar one up to, and including, the 2011 competition. The county withdrew from that competition following the 2012 edition. Kilkenny compete in the Leinster Junior Football Championship, their most notable win coming in 2011, when they defeated Wexford 3–5 to 0–13.

There is an excellent underage and adult club football structure in Kilkenny. Glenmore, Mullinavat, Railyard and Muckalee are the football strongholds. However the lure of county and club hurling championships deprives Kilkenny of its best footballers.

In 2015, Kilkenny won the All-Britain Football Championship, defeating Scotland in the final.

Kilkenny have the following achievements in football.

Leinster Senior Football Championships: 3
1888, 1900, 1911
All-Britain Football Championships: 3
2015, 2017, 2018
All-Ireland Junior Football Championships:  1
2022

Their local competition is the Kilkenny Senior Football Championship.

Ladies' football
Kilkenny won the 2007 All Ireland Ladies' Junior Football Championship, defeating London by 3–5 to 2–5 in Croke Park.
Chairman – John Gorey
Secretary – Trish Dempsey
Treasurer – Richie Windle
PRO – Noelle Curran

Kilkenny have the following achievements in ladies' football.

All Ireland Ladies' Under-16 Finalists: 1
1975
All-Ireland Junior Ladies' Football Championship: 1
2007

References

External links
  Official Kilkenny GAA site
 Kilkenny on Hoganstand.com
 Hoganstand.com - National and provincial titles won by Kilkenny teams (archived 2011)
 Hoganstand.com - Club championship winners (archived 2009)

 
Gaelic games governing bodies in Leinster
Leinster GAA
Sport in County Kilkenny
Sports organizations established in 1887